Dabala is a town in the Volta Region of Ghana. The town is known for the Dabala Secondary Technical School.  The school is a second cycle institution.

Dabala is also known for its strategic market known as the Dabala Market. This market is highly patronised by traders from the entire country of Ghana and the republic of Togo. This beautiful town is the capital of the Agave people  where the Paramount Chief of Agave (the Agave fiaga) presides over his chiefs.

Farming and distilling of local gin (Akpeteshie) is the main occupation of the people of Dabala. The Economic activities of Dabala is supported by a very vibrant Rural bank known as Agave Rural Bank which was founded in the late 1980s by a group of dedicated indigenes of Agave led by the late Mr. Frederick Samuel Kwabla Appeti.

The current Chief of Dabala is Torgbe Korkuvi Akah.

The major festival of the people of Agave is known as Dzawuwu, and it is celebrated at Dabala every other year.

The R16 Regional Highway runs from Dabala junction where it meets the N1 National Highway. It runs southward into the Anloga District.

Notes

Populated places in the Volta Region